Dual-Ghia is a rare, short-lived, automobile make, produced in the United States between 1956 and 1958. The idea for a sporty limited production car came from Eugene Casaroll, who controlled specialized vehicle builder Dual-Motors Corporation based in Detroit, Michigan; the name Dual-Ghia is representative of the collaborative efforts between the builder and Carrozzeria Ghia.

Design
The design for a luxurious sports car was to be a modified version of the Ghia-built 1954 and 1955 Dodge-based concept cars known as the Firearrow I, II, III, IV and the nearly production-ready Firebomb; which had all been designed by Luigi Segre with some possible influence from Virgil Exner. With so many cars designed along the same theme, Chrysler may well have intended to produce the Firebomb and/or the Chrysler Falcon as a response to the Ford Thunderbird and Chevrolet Corvette; for whatever reason neither made it to production. After gaining rights to the Firearrow/Firebomb design, Casaroll asked Ghia's U.S. representative (and eventual Dual-Motors VP) Paul Farago to further develop the Firebomb into a production-friendly vehicle. The series-produced design utilized an even greater number of standard production MoPar fittings, the (road-legal) Firebomb two headlamp configuration, incorporated modest tail fins and was somewhat more slab-sided and square-edged in comparison to the Firearrow/Firebomb series. While a four-place convertible was the only official body type at least one coupe was built.

The "world's longest assembly line" involved transporting a Dodge frame and drivetrain to Italy, where the bodywork and interior was fabricated by the coachbuilders at Ghia; once the partially completed vehicles were back in the U.S. Dual-Motors handled the rest. Performance was excellent, due to the cars being powered by the  Dodge hemispherical-head short-stroke V-8 engine. Not all were built with the 315 CID Dodge hemispherical head engine. Some 1957's were built with the Dodge D-500  dual quad carburetor.

Rarity 
With a retail price close to $7,500 ($ in  dollars ), the Dual-Ghia D-500 was about $200 more expensive than most American production luxury cars. It cost, for example, about $200 more than Cadillac's Eldorado Biarritz convertible. However, its price did not even come close to that of the ultra-luxurious 1956 Continental Mark II at $10,400, or the 1957 Cadillac Eldorado Brougham at $13,074, ($ in  dollars ). Of the 117 cars produced, 32 still existed as of July 2006. The cars were mostly bought by American celebrities, such as Frank Sinatra, Sterling Hayden and Richard Nixon. Desi Arnaz owned one, but he wrecked it. Dean Martin had one at one point as well, according to his son Ricci. Dean Martin can be seen driving his Dual-Ghia in the film Kiss Me, Stupid. Musician Rick Danko from 1958 owned one, which was auctioned by Sotheby's for close to $350,000 in 2015.

See also 
 Ghia

References

External links 

Defunct motor vehicle manufacturers of the United States
Motor vehicle manufacturers based in Michigan
Defunct companies based in Michigan
Cars introduced in 1956